The 1929 Pacific hurricane season ran through the summer and fall of 1929. Before the satellite age started in the 1960s, data on east Pacific hurricanes was extremely unreliable. Most east Pacific storms were of no threat to land.

Systems

Hurricane One
A "tropical hurricane" made a clockwise loop near Johnston Island between March 20 and 24.

Tropical Cyclone Two
A tropical cyclone existed from May 29 to June 1. Starting from a location southwest of the Gulf of Tehuantepec, it traveled west-northwestward not far off the Mexican shore.

Tropical Cyclone Three
A cyclone existed southwest of Acapulco on June 16 and 17.

Hurricane Four
On August 2, a tropical cyclone formed near the Mexican coast. It eventually became a hurricane, and was last seen on August 6.

Possible Tropical Cyclone Five
On August 21 and 22, a ship encountered a possible tropical cyclone at a location far from land and almost in the central Pacific basin.

Tropical Cyclone Six
On August 28, this cyclone moved along the coast, and passed over the southern tip of the Baja California Peninsula around August 31.

Hurricane Seven
On September 10, a tropical cyclone formed in the Gulf of Tehuantepec. It moved along the coast, and was a hurricane by September 13. It moved along the Pacific side of the Baja California Peninsula, and became a remnant off its northern coast on September 16. Its remnants subsequently moved inland, and dissipated around September 18.

This tropical cyclone inflicted gale or hurricane-force winds along parts of the coast of Mexico, including Manzanillo, Acapulco, and Mazatlán. An unseasonal warming was also attributed to this cyclone. It was also responsible for the strongest September winds ever recorded in San Diego up to that time.

Somewhere between Manzanillo and Acapulco, a tropical cyclone might have existed on September 19.

Tropical Cyclone Nine
On September 23, a tropical cyclone was located southeast of the Gulf of Tehuantepec. It was last observed the next day.

Other systems
It is unknown whether that cyclone is a tropical cyclone or subtropical cyclone.

See also

1929 Atlantic hurricane season
1929 Pacific typhoon season
1920s North Indian Ocean cyclone seasons
 1900–1940 South Pacific cyclone seasons
 1900–1950 South-West Indian Ocean cyclone seasons
 1920s Australian region cyclone seasons

References

Pacific hurricane seasons
1920s Pacific hurricane seasons